Live at "Dug" is a live album by pianist Barry Harris performing jazz standards and some of his own compositions recorded in 1995 on the label Enja Records. His trio also contained bassist Kunimitsu Inaba and drummer Fumio Watanabe.

Track listing 
All compositions by Barry Harris except as indicated

 "Luminescence" - 7:43
 "Somebody Loves Me" (George Gershwin) - 9:19
 "No Name Blues" (Earl Bostic) - 5:33
 "Oblivion" (Bud Powell) - 5:52
 "It Could Happen to You" (Jimmy Van Heusen) - 5:54
 "Cherokee" - (Ray Noble) - 5:25
 "On Green Dolphin Street" (Bronislav Kaper) - 7:08 
 "I Got Rhythm - Rhythm a Ning" (George Gershwin, Thelonious Monk) - 5:35
 "East of the Sun" (Brooks Bowman) - 6:54
 "Nascimento" - 4:02

Personnel 

 Barry Harris - piano
 Kunimitsu Inaba - bass
 Fumio Watanabe - drums

References 

Barry Harris live albums
1995 live albums
1997 live albums
Enja Records live albums